Line G may refer to:

Line G (Buenos Aires Underground)
G Line (Los Angeles Metro)
Line G (New York)
Line G (Tokyo Metro)
Line G (Yokohama)

See also
Line GR (Washington Metro)